New Tehri is a city and a municipal board in Tehri Garhwal District in the Indian state of Uttarakhand. It is the administrative headquarters of Tehri Garhwal District. This urban municipality area has 11 wards, from Vidhi Vihar to Vishwakarma Puram (Koti colony). 

Seema Krishali is the chairperson of Nagar Palika Tehri, and is the first female chairperson of Tehri. She won as an independent. Tehri is represented by the Tehri assembly seat of Uttarakhand and the Tehri Lok Sabha seat of India, which are represented by Dhan Singh Negi (Bhartiya Janta Party) and Mala Rajya Laxmi Shah (Bhartiya Janta Party) respectively.

History

The old town of Tehri sat at the confluence of the Bhagirathi and Bhilangna rivers. It adjoined the district of Garhwal, and its topographical features were similar. It contained the sources of both the Ganges and the Yamuna, which are visited by thousands of Hindu pilgrims.

Construction of the Tehri Dam totally submerged the old town of Tehri, and the population was shifted to the town of New Tehri. The town is famous as the site of protests against the dam by Sundarlal Bahuguna and his followers during the Chipko movement. At present the old Tehri town does not exist any longer.

Demographics
 India census, Tehri had a population of 24,014. Males constitute 65% of the population and females 35%. Tehri has an average literacy rate of 78%, higher than the national average of 74%: male literacy is 81%, and female literacy is 71%. In Tehri, 10% of the population is under 6 years of age.

Tourist places

The most visited places that are actively maintained are Devi Kunjapuri Temple, Chandrabadani Devi, Shri Adinath Digambar Jain Mandir, Mahasar Taal, Sehstra Taal, and Khatling Glacier. Some areas of Tehri are view-able but neglected by the Uttrakhand government, including Panwali Kantha, Belhbagi Bugyal, and Khait parvat. Panwali Kantha is one of the most popular treks in Uttarakhand which is listed by Outlook Traveller in their write-up. These places have the potential to attract tourists for trekking and mountaineering. The new district headquarters at New Tehri can be looked at as a future tourist spot where views of Tehri Lake can be seen. Dobra Chanti Bridge is one of the major tourist attraction due to the lightening work. It is India's longest motorable single lane suspension bridge with 440 meter long way from Dobra to Chanti. Located in the proximity of Tehri Garhwal, Narendranagar is a tourist attraction where visitors can see the River Ganga and Doon valley.

Transport

By Road 
The major highway that links New Tehri is National Highway 34. Its very well connected to major Uttarakhand cities Dehradun, Rishikesh. It is 99 km from Dehradun and 75 km from Rishikesh.

By Train 

Nearest railway station is Rishikesh Railway Station which is 71 km from New Tehri. Rishikesh is well connected to major cities of India.

By Air 
Nearest airport is Dehradun Airport in Dehradun, which is 76 km from New Tehri.

In Literature 

Letitia Elizabeth Landon's poetical illustration on Davis Cox's picture 'The Grass-Rope Bridge at Teree, in the Province of Gurwall', refers back to the time when the hill country of this province was resorted to for recuperation by Europeans suffering from the heat of the plains.

Education

Universities 
 Hemwati Nandan Bahuguna Garhwal University
 Sri Dev Suman Uttarakhand University

Colleges 
 College of Forestry & Hill Agriculture, Uttarakhand University of Horticulture and Forestry P.O. Ranichaur
 Govt. PG college, New Tehri
 Govovernment Polytechnic, New Tehri
 Sanskrit Maha Vidhlaya
 THDC Institute of Hydropower Engineering and Technology
 Govt. Nursing College, Sursinghdhar, Vill. Kanda, New Tehri

Intermediate Colleges 
 Govt. Girls Inter College, Baurai
 Govt, Pratap Inter College, Baurari
 Govt, Pratap Inter College, Moldhar
 Narendra Mahila Vidhayalay (Rajmata), B Puram
Tehri Bandh pariyojya Inter college (THDC inter college), B Puram
 Sarswati Vidhya Mandir, Inter College

Schools affiliated to ICSE 
 All Saint Convent School New Tehri

Schools affiliated to CBSE 
 Bhagirathi Vidhya Sarovar
 New Tehri International School, Painula
 Saint Anthony School
 Sarswati Shishu Mandir
Nav Gaon Public School
 Kendriya Vidalaya New Tehri Town
 Govt. Girls High School

See also 
 http://www.moneycontrol.com/news/wire-news/uttarakhand-to-setmedical-college-universitynew-tehri_623067.html
 http://www.rediff.com/money/2009/feb/20eco-tourism-hub-around-tehri-dam.htm
 http://www.business-standard.com/generalnews/news/cm-holds-review-meeting-to-boost-development-in-ukhand/37129/
 http://www.dailypioneer.com/state-editions/dehradun/84945-tourism-infra-around-tehri-to-get-big-boost-soon.html
 http://www.dailypioneer.com/state-editions/dehradun/107395-adventure-sport-to-be-promoted-in-tehri-lake-cm.html

References

External links 

        Nagar Palika Parishad Tehri (New Tehri)
 New Tehri city, Official website
 Tehri district, Official website

 
Cities and towns in Tehri Garhwal district
Hill stations in Uttarakhand